Jim Bickel is a retired American football coach.  He served as the head coach at Capital University in Columbus, Ohio from 2008 to 2009.

Bickel served as an assistant coach in a number of capacities, including at his alma mater Denison University and, before his retirement, as a defensive coordinator at Ohio Dominican University.

Head coaching record

References

Year of birth missing (living people)
Living people
Capital Comets football coaches
Denison Big Red football coaches
Findlay Oilers football coaches
Ohio Dominican Panthers football coaches
Wittenberg Tigers football coaches
Denison University alumni